Alexander Lindqvist-Hansen (born March 8, 1992) is a Swedish ice hockey player and the current captain of the Herlev Eagles in the Danish Metal Ligaen.

Lindqvist-Hansen made his Elitserien (now Swedish Hockey League) debut playing with Rögle BK during the 2012–13 Elitserien season.

References

External links

1992 births
Living people
Swedish ice hockey forwards
Herlev Eagles players
Rögle BK players
People from Skövde Municipality
IF Troja/Ljungby players
Västerviks IK players
Växjö Lakers players
Sportspeople from Västra Götaland County